Vanishing Vision is the debut studio album by Japanese heavy metal band X Japan, then known as simply X. It was released on April 14, 1988 by Extasy Records, topped the Oricon indies chart and reached number 19 on the main chart.

Overview

Vanishing Vision was released on vinyl record on April 14, 1988 on Yoshiki's own label Extasy Records. Despite being an independent record label, it sold more than ten thousand copies, topping Oricon's indie music chart. But it also reached number 19 on the main Oricon Albums Chart, making them the first indie band to enter the main chart. A limited pressing of five thousand picture discs was also made, that included a separate flexi disc of "Stab Me in the Back". This version of the song was originally included on the February 1987 Victor Records sampler Skull Thrash Zone Volume I, was recorded with Pata as a support guitar player, and is different from the one that would later appear on their third album Jealousy in 1991.

The band toured extensively in support of the record, beginning with Vanishing Tour '88 Spring throughout March and into early April. Vanishing Tour Vol.2 took them to 20 locations for 24 shows from June to July, while the Burn Out Tour '88 Oct. had 12 performances throughout October. A September 4 show at Kyoto Sports Valley, is a popular bootleg recording of the tour, however, only audio of "Stab Me in the Back" from it was officially released, being included on the 1999 Perfect Best compilation.

Vanishing Vision was re-released on CD on October 15, 1989. This was after the release of the band's second album Blue Blood on the major label CBS/Sony. In 1990, with 158,220 copies sold Vanishing Vision was the 78th best-selling album of the year, and stayed on the charts for 47 weeks. By 1997, it had sold over 800,000 copies. A digitally remastered CD version was released on September 13, 2000 by Warner Music Japan.

Composition and analysis
The album's title, Vanishing Vision, was chosen to mean the band was shedding the shameless image they had acquired for a fresh start. Its cover art drawn by Shiro Nishiguchi was inspired by the track "Sadistic Desire", with input from each band member.

Yoshiki said that "Vanishing Love," which has roughly half Japanese and half English lyrics, represents human weakness. The other members pointed out that despite being a fast song, the twin guitars and melody are more important. "Phantom of Guilt" has a 16-beat rhythm with lyrics, according to Toshi, about conflict within the human spirit. "Sadistic Desire" is a song from hide's previous band Saver Tiger, originally called "Sadistic Emotion." Yoshiki rewrote the lyrics about violent sex, inspired by the 1986 film Blue Velvet. Unusually, Taiji played the bass with his fingers for the track and it contains something of a bass solo. An alternate version of the song would later appear on X's 1991 single "Silent Jealousy".

Taiji wrote the 16-beat rhythm, slap bass song "Give Me the Pleasure" after watching a news report on a murder. The piece is unusual for X in that it uses minor seventh chords and has an ethnic drum beat that also used instruments such as the timbales and cow bell. "I'll Kill You" is a reworked version of their 1985 debut single. Yoshiki explained that the song is not about killing people as the title would suggest, but is a love song in the vein of a disgruntled married couple. Yoshiki wrote the lyrics to "Alive" to be about human life and life or death in a dream. The intro contains an excerpt of the first movement of Ludwig van Beethoven's Moonlight Sonata. hide stated that the guitar solos in this song contrast with the others on the album because they are more melodic; "a crying guitar."

The lyrics for this version of "Kurenai" are entirely in English, it would later appear mostly in Japanese on Blue Blood and be released as their major debut single, becoming one of their signature songs. While seemingly a love song, Yoshiki stated that "Kurenai" is actually about the struggle of one's heart. hide revealed that it was his favorite X song before he joined the band and was disappointed that they did not perform it when he did, so he had to nag to get them to play it. Both Toshi and Taiji felt that it has a very Japanese feel to it, with Taiji stressing that each member helped arrange it. Just as its title suggests, "Un-finished..." is a short incomplete ballad that suddenly cuts off. Yoshiki came up with the song after the album was completed feeling it needed an ending theme. It would also later be reworked and "finished" for the band's second album.

Track listing

Personnel
X
Toshi – vocals
Pata – guitar, voice
hide – guitar, voice
Taiji – bass, voice
Yoshiki – drums, voice, piano, keyboards

Production
Kinya Maekawa – director
Seiji Komura – director
Masanori Chinzei – recording engineer, mixing engineer
Hikaru Sawamura – mixing engineer
Akinori Yoshino – assistant engineer
Norio Kaziki – photography
Shiro Nishiguchi – sleeve design
NOBU – art direction & design (on CD only)
Mitsukazu "Quincy" Tanaka – digital mastering engineer (on CD only)

References

X Japan albums
1988 debut albums
Japanese-language albums
Extasy Records albums